Laxmanrao Pandurang Jadhav (Patil) (born 25 February 1938) was a member of the 13th Lok Sabha and 14th Lok Sabha of India till 2009. He represented the Satara constituency of Maharashtra and is a member of the Nationalist Congress Party (NCP) political party.

He was also a member of the 13th Lok Sabha from Satara.
His son, Makrand Patil is 3 times sitting in MLA from Wai from 2009 till now.

Positions held

 1972-80  President, Panchayat Samiti, Wai, District. Satara, Maharashtra
 1980-90  President, Zila Parishad, Satara, Maharashtra
 1999     Elected to 13th Lok SabhaPresident, Nationalist Congress Party, District. Satara, Maharashtra
 1999-2000  Member, Committee on Food, Civil Supplies and Public Distribution
 2000 onwards  Member, Consultative Committee, Ministry of Communications

External links
 Official biographical sketch in Parliament of India website

Living people
1938 births
People from Satara district
India MPs 2004–2009
India MPs 1999–2004
Marathi politicians
Nationalist Congress Party politicians from Maharashtra
Lok Sabha members from Maharashtra
Maharashtra district councillors